Bodø Station is a railway station located in the center of the town of Bodø in Bodø Municipality in Nordland county, Norway.  The station is the terminus of the Nordland Line that was completed in 1961. The station is served by day- and night trains to Trondheim and commuter trains to Rognan, operated by SJ Norge using Class 93 units.

The decision to build the railway to Bodø was made in 1923, but was not completed until the 1960s due to lack of funds and World War II.

References

Railway stations in Nordland
Railway stations on the Nordland Line
Railway stations opened in 1961
1961 establishments in Norway
Buildings and structures in Bodø